Stone County School District No. 1 was a school district headquartered in Timbo in unincorporated Stone County, Arkansas. It operated Timbo Elementary School (K-6) and Timbo High School (7-12).

History
On July 1, 1993, the Tri-County School District dissolved, and the Stone County district absorbed a portion of it. On July 1, 2004, the Stone County district consolidated with Rural Special School District into the existing Mountain View School District.

References

Further reading
These include maps of predecessor districts:
 (Download)

External links
 
 Stone County School District No. 1 Stone County, Arkansas General Purpose Financial Statements and Other Reports June 30, 2001
 Stone County School District No. 1  Stone County, Arkansas Basic Financial Statements and Other Reports June 30, 2004

Education in Stone County, Arkansas
School districts disestablished in 2004
2004 disestablishments in Arkansas
Defunct school districts in Arkansas